TOCS may refer to:

They're Only Chasing Safety, a post-hardcore album by Underoath
ACM Transactions on Computer Systems, a scientific journal
Theory of Computing Systems, a scientific journal